is the sequel to 1994's Virtua Fighter 2 and the third fighting game in the Virtua Fighter series, developed by Sega AM2 and published by Sega in 1996. It was the first arcade game to run on the Sega Model 3 system board.

Like its predecessors, Virtua Fighter 3 was a major hit in arcades, selling 30,000 arcade cabinets worldwide. In Japan, it was the fourth highest-grossing arcade game of 1996 and the overall highest-grossing arcade game of 1997. A port for the Sega Saturn was announced but ultimately cancelled. However, the game eventually reached home consoles in the form of a conversion for the Dreamcast.

Gameplay
This iteration is the first in the series to have undulation in the stages, such as a staircase in the Great Wall stage, a stage set on top of a sloping roof and a raft constructed of individually moving elements on a bobbing water surface.

A fourth button, the Dodge, was added (the series had previously used only three - Kick, Punch and Guard). Pressing the button with the joystick in neutral or held up makes the character move into the screen (i.e. away from the viewer), while pressing the button with the joystick held down makes the character move out of the screen (i.e. towards the viewer). This 'evasion' technique enables players to dodge incoming attacks, creating opportunities to counter-attack almost immediately.

Characters
Returning characters are: Akira Yuki, Pai Chan, Lau Chan, Wolf Hawkfield, Jeffry McWild, Kage-Maru, Sarah Bryant, Jacky Bryant, Shun Di, Lion Rafale, Dural. Two new Japanese characters were added to the roster of fighters: Aoi Umenokoji, a beautiful Japanese woman and a childhood friend of Akira Yuki who used a nimble form of aiki-jujutsu as her fighting style of choice, and Taka-Arashi, a sumo wrestler from Japan.

Taka Arashi would not make another appearance in the Virtua Fighter series until Virtua Fighter 5 R; the series' producer Hiroshi Kataoka explained that the removal of Taka in subsequent installments was due to the technical implications of having a substantially larger character. Taka had in fact nearly been cut from Virtua Fighter 3 due to difficulties with his jumping moves.

Plot

Judgement 6, an organization seeking global domination, are hosting a third fighting tournament. The characters all enter to achieve their personal goals. Some wish to challenge Judgement 6 and uncover the group's secrets. Kage-Maru won the tournament. whose actual specialty is Jujutsu, has a vendetta against the Syndicate that killed his father. The Syndicate also took his mother away from him and made her as one of their fighters. He made an impressive showing as a fighter during the first tournament but was not able to find much information on Judgement 6, although he did receive word that his mother is still alive, he hopes to learn more the second time around, in the past tournament he succeeded in saving his mother (who had been transformed into Dural). When a Bajiquan fighter Akira defeated Dural and thereby saving Tsukikage from both Judgement 6's brainwashing and Dural state at the end of second tournament, Kage was able to get his mother back.

For many months, Kage and his mother lived a peaceful life in a small, hidden village. When about a year had passed, though, Kage's mother was suddenly struck by a mysterious illness. Kage's investigation into her ailment revealed that it was an after-effect of her transformation into Dural, and now he is entering the new tournament to find out what connection this has to the new-model Dural, After winning this world tournament, Kage managed to recover a part from the new type Dural. He used that part on his mother, hoping it would cure her. However, the plan backfired. Not only did his mother not recover, it caused his mother to transform back to Dural. She immediately attacked Kage. Sensing no way out, Kage decides to kill her in order to end her suffering. He was nearly successful but she managed to escape and was ultimately rescued by J6. Kage hears of the 4th world tournament and decides to enter the tournament with every intention of killing Dural.

History
Virtua Fighter 3 was the launch title for the arcade board Model 3 from Sega. Developed by Yu Suzuki's Sega AM2, it was a revolutionary game from a technical standpoint, with its detailed graphics earning widespread praise. Characters' eyes appeared to track the opponent's position, their muscles could flex and relax, and the fighting arenas featured stairs and slopes. The game also introduced the ability to move in three dimensions to the series with the dodge move, a feature that was apparently added fairly late in development, as Suzuki said in an interview held during the third quarter of 1995: "The fact that the game is 2D from the player's perspective probably won't change in VF3. If the viewpoint changes rapidly during gameplay, the player can't concentrate on the game, and it's difficult to keep up with the situation your character is in, as in [Battle Arena Toshinden]." In addition, he stated later in the same interview that he intended to keep Virtua Fighter 3 a three-button game like its predecessors.

The game was unveiled at Tokyo's AOU show in February 1996. Sega displayed non-playable demos of Lau Chan, Dural, and new character Aoi Umenokoji, who was unveiled for the first time at the show. However, Dural, the robotic final boss, garnered the most attention, due to being made of a metallic surface that reflected the surrounding environment. A playable demo with just two characters, Jacky Bryant and Dural, was shown to a select handful of individuals at the show. Computer and Video Games described the game's demo, also shown at Miami's ACME show in early March 1996, as "the most astounding display of video game graphic muscle ever in the history of this industry." According to Next Generation magazine, Virtua Fighter 3 "stunned the crowd" and "stole the show hands down."

Yu Suzuki said the added characters, Aoi and Taka-Arashi, were inspired in part by a desire to introduce traditional Japanese martial arts to the Virtua Fighter series, which had previously been dominated by Chinese martial arts.

During the game's beta testing at the Sega Joyopolis Arcade in Tokyo, players waited in line six to eight hours for one round of combat. By this time the development was focused on fine-tuning the timing of the moves and sensitivity of the buttons.

Yu Suzuki announced a Sega Saturn port at a late 1996 press conference (the same conference at which Fighters Megamix was unveiled), elaborating that AM2 research had been studying Virtua Fighter 3 for the past few months and had at last determined that it was possible to create a Saturn port comparable to the arcade version. To facilitate the conversion, AM2's Research and Development labs spent some months working on a 3D accelerator cartridge for the Saturn, but the cartridge was canceled for undisclosed reasons. Sega officials nonetheless stated that Virtua Fighter 3 would be ported to the Saturn with or without the upgrade cartridge. According to insiders, this cartridge was being designed by Lockheed Martin Corporation and based on the same Real3D chipset used in their upcoming 3D accelerator card for PCs that was being done in collaboration with Silicon Graphics and Intel (and based on years of experience on the docking simulations of the Apollo CSM with NASA). Staff from Core Design claimed to have seen the completed 3D accelerator cartridge in action during an early 1997 visit to Sega of Japan, running a demo of the Saturn version of Virtua Fighter 3 with two playable characters.

Virtua Fighter 3tb
Virtua Fighter 3tb is an update version of Virtua Fighter 3 that features battles between teams of various fighters (the "tb" stands for "team battle"), who fight each other one at a time, as well new moves and other tweaks. This "team battle" version was later released on Sega's Dreamcast console, being one of its launch games, becoming one of the best-selling Dreamcast games in Japan. Virtua Fighter 3 was intended to be a launch title for the Dreamcast in North America, but it was delayed. Although it did eventually come to North America, it wasn't nearly as successful as it was in Japan.

Reception

Arcade
In Japan, Game Machine listed Virtua Fighter 3 on their October 15, 1996 issue as being the most-successful dedicated arcade game of the month. It went on to become Japan's fourth highest-grossing arcade game of 1996, and then Japan's overall highest-grossing arcade game of 1997. Game Machine also listed Virtua Fighter 3tb on their November 15, 1997 issue as being the fifth most-successful dedicated arcade game of the month. In North America, Virtua Fighter 3 had a successful launch in September 1996, drawing large crowds at the Amusement & Music Operators Association (AMOA) show where it was the most anticipated game. Worldwide, the game sold 30,000 arcade cabinets by 1997, including 18,000 in Japan and 12,000 overseas. It was more successful than Namco's rival Tekken 3 (1997) in Japan, whereas Tekken 3 was more successful worldwide.

Virtua Fighter 3 received positive reviews from critics. Computer and Video Games reviewed the arcade version in its November 1996 issue and declared that it "is the best 3D fighting game ever." Sushi-X of Electronic Gaming Monthly felt that the traditional fighting styles represented by the two new characters were both executed very well. He said that both the graphics and the combat innovations fully lived up to the high expectations for the Model 3 board, though he was somewhat disappointed that the game did not significantly diverge from the style of Virtua Fighter 2. Bruised Lee of GamePro considered this a critical problem, summarizing that "VF3's graphics showcase an awesome level of visual realism never before seen in any game, but too many recycled Virtua Fighter 2 features keep VF3 from being a true masterpiece." He particularly cited the small number of new moves for the returning characters. A Next Generation critic instead described the game as "uniquely engrossing and technologically advanced in every way, from its gameplay, to its graphics, backgrounds, characters, and sound effects." He opined that the two new characters were not interesting enough to attract newcomers to the series, but had depth, playability, and uniqueness on par with the well-regarded returning cast. He also concluded the usage of the dodge button and opponent tracking "makes VF3 the first game to full realize 3D gameplay."

AllGame's Brett Alan Weiss reviewed the arcade version and scored it 4.5 out of 5 stars, concluding that it is a "deep game with a cinematic look and virtually limitless replay value". The 5th GameFan Megawards of 1996 gave Virtua Fighter 3 the award for Coin-Op Game of the Year. It also won the 1996 Spotlight Award for Best Arcade Game and was a runner-up for Electronic Gaming Monthlys Arcade Game of the Year, behind Street Fighter Alpha 2. The 10th Gamest Awards gave it the award for Best Graphics of 1996, and it placed fourth place for overall Game of the Year and fifth place for Best Fighting Game.

Dreamcast
Virtua Fighter 3tb for the Dreamcast sold 330,631 units in Japan and 96,390 units in the United States, for a combined  units sold in Japan and the United States.

Edge reviewed the Dreamcast version and gave it an 8/10, stating "Bouts take place atop sloping downtown rooftops and on flights of steps, in the lapping waters of a desert island and on the Great Wall of China...But Virtua Fighter has grown into a highly technical game since the inception of the series in 1993, resulting in the uneven floors of the third game affecting the movement and attacks of the characters...Where once Tekken'''s approachable 'one button for each limb' system seemed the way forward for the genre, it limits interaction in a true three-dimensional space. VFs alternative, with buttons for punch, kick, defend and dodge, while perhaps not offering the same scope for multiple attack movements, allows you to control the characters with unrivalled grace." GameSpot's James Mielke praised the Dreamcast version, awarding it 8.2/10, saying "Virtua Fighter fans will find all they need neatly wrapped in this package". Allgame's Cal Nguyen, however, compared the Dreamcast version unfavorably with Soul Calibur.

Jeff Lundrigan reviewed the Dreamcast version of Virtua Fighter 3tb for Next Generation, rating it four stars out of five, and stated that "A peek beneath the exterior shows that it's still got all the right moves – the question is, will you look?"

In the arcades, the game was very successful, to the point where the profits from this game and Virtua Fighter 4 helped recoup the losses Sega received from the commercial failure of Shenmue''. It hit the top of the arcade charts in Japan upon release, despite initially appearing almost solely in arcades owned by Sega itself, due to the cabinet's high price.

The arcade release of 3tb would see a resurgence beginning in the mid-2010s when Japanese game centers a-cho and Mikado began hosting new weekly tournaments. Those would eventually grow to large yearly events involving a wide variety of players both new and veteran. As of 2020, 3tb is widely played competitively in Japanese game centers, with a large number of weekly, monthly and yearly events coordinated by an informal organisation of players.

References

External links
 
 
 

1996 video games
Arcade video games
Cancelled Sega Saturn games
Dreamcast games
Sega-AM2 games
Sega arcade games
Sega video games
Virtua Fighter
Multiplayer and single-player video games
Video games designed by Yu Suzuki
Video games scored by Takenobu Mitsuyoshi
Video games developed in Japan